EV3 is the third studio album by American female vocal group En Vogue. It was released by East West Records on June 17, 1997, in the United States. Recorded after a lengthy break during which the group members became mothers or established solo careers, the album was En Vogue's first project to include a diverse roster of collaborators including credits from Babyface, David Foster, Diane Warren, Andrea Martin, Ivan Matias, and Organized Noize along with regular contributors Foster & McElroy. It marked their first album without Dawn Robinson, who decided to leave the group late into the recording of EV3 in favor of a solo recording contract, prompting the remaining trio to re-record much of the material for the album.

Upon its release, EV3 received mixed reviews from critics, many of whom praised the group’s vocal performances but were critical with overall production of the album. In the US, the album debuted at number eight on both Billboards Top R&B/Hip-Hop Albums chart and the Billboard 200 with sales of 76,500 units, the band's highest first-week numbers. Internationally, EV3 entered the top forty on most charts it appeared on and remains En Vogue's highest-charting effort to date. Certified Platinum by the RIAA and Silver the BPI, the album produced three pop and R&B hit singles, including "Don't Let Go (Love)", "Whatever" and "Too Gone, Too Long".

Background
In 1992, En Vogue released their second studio album Funky Divas (1992). A major success, it sold 3.5 million copies worldwide and generated three top ten singles. Following extensive touring in support of the album, the quartet started what would become a longer hiatus. While band members Cindy Herron and Maxine Jones went on maternity leave, Terry Ellis reteamed with regular En Vogue contributors Foster & McElroy to work on her solo album Southern Gal which was released to lackluster success in November 1995. In the meantime, En Vogue lent their vocals to the collaborative single "Freedom (Theme from Panther)" (1995) and recorded "Don't Let Go (Love)" for the soundtrack to the motion picture Set It Off (1996). Released in the autumn, it became the group's biggest hit yet, selling over 1.8 million copies worldwide and becoming certified platinum by the RIAA.

In response to the large commercial success of "Don't Let Go (Love)", the group steadfastly went to work on its third studio album. Originally called Friendship, it marked En Vogue's first project that was not fully produced by McElroy and Foster, with additional production coming from Babyface, Andrea Martin, David Foster, Diane Warren, and Ivan Matias to provide the group with a new modern sound. As the album was nearing completion, Dawn Robinson chose to leave the group in April 1997 for a solo recording contract with Dr. Dre's Aftermath Records after difficult contractual negotiations reached a stalemate. Her abrupt departure from En Vogue forced the remaining trio to re-record several of her original lead vocals; however, not every track was re-recorded, with Robinson's leads remaining intact on several tracks and her background vocals still appearing on every song with the exception of "Does Anybody Hear Me". The track "Let It Flow" reuses the main riff of the 1977 hit single "Slide" by funk band Slave.

Critical reception

Ann Powers, writing for Spin, felt that the album "follows the groove laid down by the group's creators, Denzil Foster and Thomas McElroy, expressing female prowess in terms of lovesexy seductiveness, socially conscious righteousness, and ail-that independent attitude." Complimenting En Vogue's "flawless form"; she concluded that "like an acrobatic Jordan jam with a minute left in the fourth quarter, EV3 elicits a familiar, gleeful wonder at humanity's potential." In her review for Newsweek,  Allison Samuels wrote that EV3 "has all the right ingredients". Los Angeles Times writer Connie Johnson felt Dawn Robinson's presence on her final work with the group was "an integral part of the womanly, more mature stance of this album." She ranked Diane Warren–penned "Too Gone, Too Long" among the album's highlights, calling it a "performance upon which musical reps are truly built".

Opposed to this, Stephen Leo Stanley from AllMusic found that Dawn Robinson's departure left the album unaffected since "the group's harmonies remain remarkably supple and soulful". While he considered EV3 full of "enough strong moments", he was critical of the band's decision to work with Warren and regular producer David Foster and their adult contemporary sound on "Too Gone, Too Long". Chicago Tribune editor Monica Eng commented that EV3 found the band dabbling "in an array of genres, trying to find their new voice", with uneven results. Entertainment Weeklys J.D. Considine noted that EV3 unlined the group's status as a "producer's pets", citing that on EV3 "no surprise, then, that although the women get top billing, the arrangements are the real stars." In his Consumer Guide, Robert Christgau gave the album a "B−" rating.

Commercial performance
In the United States, EV3 debuted at number eight on both the US Billboard Top R&B/Hip-Hop Albums chart and the Billboard 200 in the issue dated July 5, 1997. Selling approximately 76,500 copies in its first week of release, the album marked the band's highest debut on both charts as well as their biggest first week sales yet. On August 26, 1997, EV3 was awarded platinum by the Recording Industry Association of America (RIAA), indicating sales in excess of 1.0 million copies. Elsewhere, the album entered the top forty on most charts it appeared on. EV3 reached top ten in Germany, Switzerland, and the United Kingdom becoming the band's second top ten album after Funky Divas.

EV3 spawned three hit singles. Lead single, "Don't Let Go (Love)", was a worldwide hit and peaked at number 2 on the Billboard Hot 100 and number 1 on Billboards Hot R&B/Hip-Hop Songs chart. The single sold 1.3 million copies in the United States and was certified platinum by the RIAA. The second single, "Whatever" peaked at number 16 on the Billboard Hot 100 and number 8 on Billboard's Hot R&B/Hip-Hop Songs chart. The single was certified gold by the RIAA after sales of over 500,000 copies. "Too Gone, Too Long", the album's final single released, was a top 40 hit on both the Billboard Hot 100 at number 33 and Hot R&B/Hip-Hop Songs at number 25.

Track listing

Notes
  denotes co-producer
  denotes vocal producer

Credits and personnel

Terry Ellis, Cindy Herron, Maxine Jones, Dawn Robinson – lead vocals, backing vocals
Denzil Foster, Thomas McElroy – music arranger, backing vocals 
James Earley – electric guitar, bass
Thomas McElroy, Denzil Foster – keyboard, drum machine
Norbet Stachel – saxophone
Garry Barnes – bass
Bernard Grobeman – guitar
Marlon McClain – electric guitar, acoustic guitar 
Chanz – grand piano
Babyface – synthesizer, electric piano, drum programming
Kevin Wyatt, Nate Phillips – bass guitar
Giuliano Franco – synthesizer, drum programming
Lil John – drums
Preston Crump – bass
Martin Terry, Tommy Martin – guitar
Mark Coleman – electric guitar
Bill Ortiz – trumpet
Ken Kessie – mixing
Steve Counter – engineering

Organized Noize – production
Jason Eckl – guitar 
Neal H. Pogue – mixing
Dennis Bolden – organ, programming
Andrea Martin – production
James Gass – programming
JAH – rap vocals
Chris Bolden, Ivan Matias – production
Rudy Haeusermann – engineering
David Foster – keyboards, production
Dean Parks – acoustic guitar 
Blake Eisenman – engineering
Michael Thompson – electric guitar
Felipe Elgueta – engineering
Adrion Sinclair – programming
Pro-Jay – programming, production
Cindy Herron, Terry Ellis, Maxine Jones – vocal arrangement
Denzil Foster, Thomas McElroy – production, arrangement and composition
Sylvia Rhone – executive production
En Vogue – executive production

Charts

Weekly charts

Year-end charts

Certifications

References

External links
 En Vogue – Ev3, Japan Ed. (CD, Album) at Discogs

1997 albums
En Vogue albums
Albums produced by Babyface (musician)
Albums produced by Organized Noize
Albums produced by David Foster
East West Records albums